Bratina  is a village in Croatia, located in Pisarovina municipality in Zagreb County. In the 2001 Census its recorded population was 701. It is known for traditional costumes including horned headgear and necklaces with glass beads. It was the venue for the 16th IAU World Field Crossbow Championships in 2012.

References

Populated places in Zagreb County